Babaleshwar Assembly constituency is one of the 224 Legislative Assembly constituencies of Karnataka state in India. It is in Bijapur district.

Members of the Legislative Assembly

Election results

2018

See also
List of constituencies of the Karnataka Legislative Assembly
Bijapur district, Karnataka

References

Assembly constituencies of Karnataka
Bijapur district, Karnataka